Ajai Kumar Singh  (born in 1953) is an Indian chemist and Emeritus Professor of Chemistry at IIT Delhi. Singh is known for his contribution to the development of new organochalcogen ligand family and their metal complexes for promoting carbon-carbon coupling and related transformations. Singh is an honorary member of Science Faculty of the University of Delhi.

Early life and education
Ajai was born in New Delhi, India. He completed his master's degree in Inorganic Chemistry at University of Delhi. In 1977 Singh was promoted to Ph.D. at University of Delhi. His thesis advisor was RP Singh.

Career
Singh was a postdoctoral fellow at Aston University with W. R. McWhinnie. In 1982, he joined IIT faculty as an assistant professor of chemistry. He was promoted to associate professor in 1995 and to Professor in 2000. He has coauthored over 200 accepted academic publications. He is known for his involvement in the development of organochalcogen ligand family and their metal complexes for promoting C-C coupling reactions and related transformations. As of 2015, he served as an editorial member for the academic journal, RSC Advances.

Notable awards
 Fellow Royal Society of Chemistry
 Honorary Member; Science Faculty, University of Delhi, 2003 onwards
 Adjunct Professor Doon University, Dehradun, India, 2016-2018
 Member of American Chemical Society, 2015-2018
 Guest Editor, Journal of Chemical Sciences (Springer), 2006, Vol. 118, Issue 6
 Convener, Developing Talent in the Chemical Sciences Initiative, Royal Society of Chemistry, U K, 26 September 2011  
 President, Inorg. Section, Indian Council of Chemist, Convention, Dec 2011

References

1953 births
Living people
People from New Delhi
Indian inorganic chemists
Delhi University alumni
Academic staff of IIT Delhi